Most of the early newspapers in the Persian Gulf region were established in Saudi Arabia. The first newspaper founded in the country and in the Persian Gulf area is Al Fallah, which was launched in Mecca in 1920. All of the newspapers published in Saudi Arabia are privately owned.

Arabic daily newspapers

 Al-Bilad
 Al Eqtisadiah
Al Hayat
Al Jazirah
Al Madina
 Al Nadwa
Al Riyadeyyah
Al Riyadh
Al Watan
Al Yaum
Makkah News Paper
Asharq Al Awsat
Okaz

English daily newspapers
Arab News
Saudi Gazette

Urdu daily newspaper
Urdu News

Malayalam daily newspapers-Kerala 
Malayalam News 
Dammam edition 
Jeddah edition  - launched in 1999 
Riyadh edition 
Madhyamam
Abha edition - 1 January 2011 
Dammam edition - 24 May 2008
Jeddah edition - 16 January 2006 
Riyadh edition - 10 December 2007
Gulf Thejas
Dammam edition - March 2011
Jeddah edition - March 2011 
Riyadh edition - March 2011
 Chandrika

Defunct daily newspapers
These newspapers are no longer published:
  Akhbar Al Dhahran (1954–1956)
 Riyadh Daily (1967–1 January 2004)
 Shams

See also

 List of magazines in Saudi Arabia
 Media of Saudi Arabia
 List of companies of Saudi Arabia

References

External links
 

Saudi Arabia

Newspapers